Good Times is the fourth full-length album by Bagdad Cafe the Trench Town. It was released in August 2006. It is their second album to be released under Victor Entertainment. Good Times appeared in the Oricon album chart for 4 weeks after its release and its highest position was #75 making it the highest ranking Bagdad Cafe the Trench Town album.

Track listing

Personnel
 Mai - vocals
 Raita - EG
 Mura - EG/AG Junichi Martin
 Yama - bass 
  - drums
  - Ep/clavinova/piano
 Big Mom - chorus 
 Ran - chorus 
  - organ/moog the SOURCE/minimoog  
 Ogi - tenor saxophone
 Umeken - trombone

References 

2006 albums
Victor Entertainment albums